Mantispidae, known commonly as mantidflies, mantispids, mantid lacewings, mantisflies or mantis-flies, is a family of small to moderate-sized insects in the order Neuroptera. There are many genera with around 400 species worldwide, especially in the tropics and subtropics. Only 5 species of Mantispa occur in Europe. As their names suggest, members of the group possess raptorial forelimbs similar to those of praying mantis, a case of convergent evolution.

Description and ecology

The vernacular and scientific names are derived from their mantis-like appearance, as their spiny "raptorial" front legs are modified to catch small insect prey and are very similar to the front legs of mantids (the only difference is that the pincers lack footpads and are not used for walking at all). The adults are predatory insects that are often nocturnal, and are sometimes attracted by porch lights or blacklights. They are usually green, brown, yellow, and sometimes pink, and have four membranous wings which may sometimes be patterned (especially in wasp mimicking species) but are usually clear. Adult mantidflies are predators of suitably sized insects, which they catch as mantids do. However, the underlying mechanisms for the prey capture behavior are different in mantidflies and mantids.<ref>Kral, K (2013). Vision in the mantispid: a sit-and-wait and stalking predatory insect. Physiological Entomology 38: 1-12.</ref> Mantidflies are active hunters, but as with other Neuroptera, they are cumbersome fliers.

Symphrasinae larvae are sedentary parasitoids on bee, wasp or scarab beetle larvae. Larvae of the Calomantispinae are predators of small arthropods, and in at least one species they are mobile. Mantispinae have the most specialized larval development among all mantidflies studied to date (the life history of the Drepanicinae remains unknown): their campodeiform larvae seek out female spiders or their egg sacs which they then enter; the scarabaeiform larvae then feed on the spider eggs, draining egg contents through a piercing/sucking tube formed by modified mandibles and maxillae, pupating in the egg sac.

First-instar mantispids use two strategies to locate spider eggs: larvae may burrow directly through the silk of egg sacs they find, or they may board and be carried by female spiders prior to sac production (phoresy), entering the sac as it is being constructed. Mantispids that board spiders usually adopt positions on or near the pedicel; some species may enter the spider's book lungs. Larvae maintain themselves aboard spiders by feeding on spider hemolymph. Transfers of larvae from spider to spider are possible during spider mating or cannibalism. All of the major groups of hunting spiders are attacked by spider-boarding mantispids; the egg sacs of web-building species are also entered by egg-sac penetrators.

Systematics
Among the Neuroptera (which includes lacewings and owlflies), mantidflies are apparently most closely related to the Dilaridae (pleasing lacewings) and the thorny (Rhachiberothidae) and beaded lacewings (Berothidae). These and the prehistoric Mesithonidae - probably a paraphyletic assemblage rather than a natural group - form the superfamily Mantispoidea.

Many mantidflies are placed in one of the four subfamilies, of which the Symphrasinae are probably the most distinct and the Mantispinae are the most advanced. But a considerable number of taxa cannot be easily accommodated in this layout, and are therefore better treated as incertae sedis at present.

Extant taxa based on Global Biodiversity Information Facility and extinct taxa based on Jepson, 2015 and subsequent literature.

Calomantispinae
 Calomantispa Banks, 1913
 Nolima Navás, 1914

Drepanicinae
 †Acanthomantispa Lu et al. 2020 Burmese amber, Myanmar, Late Cretaceous (Cenomanian)
†Aragomantispa Pérez-de la Fuente and Peñalver 2019 Spanish amber, Early Cretaceous (Albian)
†Dicranomantispa Lu et al. 2020 Burmese amber, Myanmar, CenomanianDitaxis McLachlan, 1867
 Drepanicus Blanchard, 1851
 Gerstaeckerella Enderlein, 1910
†Liassochrysa Ansorge and Schlüter 1990 Green Series, Germany, Early Jurassic (Toarcian)
†Promantispa Panfilov 1980 Karabastau Formation, Kazakshtan, Middle/Late Jurassic
†Psilomantispa Lu et al. 2020 Burmese amber, Myanmar, Cenomanian
†Sinuijumantispa So & Won, 2022 Sinuiju Formation, North Korea, Early Cretaceous (Aptian)
 Theristria Gerstaecker, 1884

Mantispinae

 Afromantispa Snyman & Ohl, 2012
 Asperala Lambkin, 1986
 Austroclimaciella Handschin, 1961
 Austromantispa Esben-Petersen, 1917
 Buyda Navás, 1926
 Campanacella Handschin, 1961
 Campion Navás, 1914
 Cercomantispa Handschin, 1959
 Climaciella Enderlein, 1910
 Dicromantispa Hoffman, 2002
 Entanoneura Enderlein, 1910
 Euclimacia Enderlein, 1910
 Eumantispa Okamoto, 1910
†Feroseta Poinar 2006 Dominican amber, Miocene
 Haematomantispa Hoffman, 2002
 Leptomantispa Hoffman, 2002
 Madantispa Fraser, 1952
 Mantispa Illiger, 1798
 Mimetispa Handschin, 1961
 Nampista Navás, 1914
 Necyla Navás, 1913
 Nivella Navás, 1930
 Orientispa Poivre, 1984
 Paramantispa Williner & Kormilev, 1959
 Paulianella Handschin, 1960
†Prosagittalata Nel 1988 Céreste, France, Rupelian
 Pseudoclimaciella Handschin, 1960
 Rectinerva Handschin, 1959
 Sagittalata Handschin, 1959
 Spaminta Lambkin, 1986
 Stenomantispa Stitz, 1913
 Toolida Lambkin, 1986
 Tuberonotha Handschin, 1961
†Vectispa  Lambkin 1986 Bembridge Marls, United Kingdom, Eocene (Priabonian)
 Xaviera (lacewing) Lambkin, 1986
 Xeromantispa Hoffman, 2002
 Zeugomantispa Hoffman, 2002

Symphrasinae
Auth: Navás, 1909
 †Archaeosymphrasis Shi et al. 2020 Burmese amber, Myanmar, Cenomanian
 Anchieta Navás, 1909
†Habrosymphrasis Shi et al. 2020 Burmese amber, Myanmar, Cenomanian
†Haplosymphrasites Lu et al. 2020 Burmese amber, Myanmar, Cenomanian
†Parasymphrasites Lu et al. 2020 Burmese amber, Myanmar, CenomanianPlega Navás, 1927 - Americas
 †Symphrasites Wedmann & Makarkin, 2007 Messel Pit, Germany, EoceneTrichoscelia Westwood, 1852

 †Mesomantispinae 
Auth: Makarkin 1996

 †Archaeodrepanicus Jepson et al. 2013 Yixian Formation, China, Early Cretaceous (Aptian)
 †Clavifemora Jepson et al. 2013 Daohugou, China, Middle/Late Jurassic
 †Karataumantispa Jepson 2015 Karabastau Formation, Kazakhstan, Middle/Late Jurassic
 †Mesomantispa Makarkin 1996 Zaza Formation, Russia, Aptian
 †Ovalofemora Jepson et al. 2018 Karabastau Formation, Kazakhstan, Middle/Late Jurassic
 †Sinomesomantispa Jepson et al. 2013 Yixian Formation, China, Aptian

Unassigned

 Allomantispa Liu, Wu, Winterton & Ohl, 2014
 Entatoneura Enderlein, 1910
 Fera (lacewing) Whalley, 1983
 Forciada Kozhanchikov, 1949
 Longicollum - monotypic Longicollum benmaddoxi Jepson et al., 2018
 Manega Navás, 1929
 Promantispa Jarzembowski, 1980
 Prosagittalata Nel, 1988

Fossil taxa may be of an altogether quite basal position, for example the Jurassic Liassochrysa (about 180 million years old) and Promantispa (about 155 million years old) have been assigned to either a basal position within the group or Drepanicinae, the most basal subfamily within the group. The Early Jurassic Prohemerobius dilaroides (the type species of the "Prohemerobiidae" assemblage) as well as the Late Permian Permantispa emelyanovi (of the just as likely paraphyletic "Permithonidae") were suggested to possibly represent ancestral mantidflies However, later studies found them to be basal members of Psychopsoidea and Neuroptera respectively.

Most living genera from which fossil species are also known to go back to the Miocene; the Oligocene "Climaciella" henrotayi probably does not belong in the living genus. Two fossil species have been described as part of the extant genus Dicromantispa, Dicromantispa moronei from Dominican amber and Dicromantispa electromexicana from Mexican amber.

The North American species include:Paraberotha, Retinoberotha and Whalfera were formerly placed here, but have since been recognized as Rhachiberothidae. Mantispidiptera'' are diminutive insects, apparently neuropterans of some sort, perhaps Hemerobiiformia; their exact affiliation cannot at present be determined because of their odd apomorphies, though they are unlikely to have been mantidflies.

References

External links

Mantispoidea
Insects used as insect pest control agents
Neuroptera families
Extant Early Jurassic first appearances